Heo Jun (or  ; born 31 May 1988) is a South Korean foil fencer. He is the four-time Asian champion (individual and team). He won a bronze medal at the 2011 Summer Universiade in Shenzhen. Heo is a graduate of Daegu University.

References
Profile  on fencingworldwide.com

Living people
1988 births
Fencers from Seoul
South Korean male foil fencers
Fencers at the 2016 Summer Olympics
Olympic fencers of South Korea
Fencers at the 2010 Asian Games
Fencers at the 2014 Asian Games
Fencers at the 2018 Asian Games
Asian Games gold medalists for South Korea
Asian Games silver medalists for South Korea
Asian Games bronze medalists for South Korea
Asian Games medalists in fencing
Medalists at the 2010 Asian Games
Medalists at the 2014 Asian Games
Medalists at the 2018 Asian Games
Universiade medalists in fencing
Universiade bronze medalists for South Korea
Medalists at the 2011 Summer Universiade
Daegu University alumni
Sogang University alumni
20th-century South Korean people
21st-century South Korean people